Lissonota is a genus of ichneumon wasps in the family Ichneumonidae. There are at least 390 described species in Lissonota.

See also
 List of Lissonota species

References

Further reading

External links

 

Parasitic wasps